Dasha River is a river in southwestern Shenzhen in Guangdong, China. It rises in Mount Yangtai, and flows generally southwest, passing through the Nanshan District and emptying into the South China Sea in Shenzhen Bay.

Tributaries 
The Changlingpi Stream is a largest tributary to Dasha River, it rises in Changlingpi Reservoir.

Environmental concerns
As the only river flowing through Nanshan District, Dasha River is a receiving waters of industrial wastewater and domestic sewage in the district. Although the  river training works has been going on for more than 8 years, but it has not been effective and the trend year-on-year increase.

References

External links

Rivers of Shenzhen
Nanshan District, Shenzhen